Mae Mo may refer to the following places in Thailand:
Mae Mo District
Mae Mo, Mae Mo, the seat of the district